House of Bluebird is a 2015 South Korean television series starring Lee Joon-hyuk, Chae Soo-bin, Lee Sang-yeob and Kyung Soo-jin. It aired on KBS2 from February 25 to August 9, 2015, on Saturdays and Sundays at 19:55 (KST) for 50 episodes.

Themes
House of Bluebird addresses the differing inter-generational attitudes of Koreans towards work; and the conflict between the desire to fulfill personal dreams and the need to make a living.

Synopsis
The scion of a formerly wealthy traditional land-owning family Kim Ji-wan grew up an orphan raised by his step-mother and grandmother when his father died and his family lost its fortune. To provide for his family Ji-wan swallows his pride and uses nepotism to join Nuga Global, a multi-national medical appliances company. Ji-wan is initially grateful when Jang Tae-soo, Nuga's CEO and a friend of his late father, takes him under his wing. As the lives of Ji-wan's family and that of Tae-soo cross again long hidden secrets, such as how Ji-wan's father died and came to lose his fortune, begin to unravel. Desperate to protect the business and reputation he has built Tae-soo uses a secret that Ji-wan's stepmother has kept from Ji-wan and his grandmother.

Cast

Main characters 
 Lee Joon-hyuk as Kim Ji-wan
29, new employee at Nuga Global.
 Chae Soo-bin as Han Eun-soo
24, Ji-wan's non-biological sister. She used to work as a part-time employee in a pizza restaurant before she was employed in Nuga Global as a product designer.
 Lee Sang-yeob as Jang Hyun-do
28, son of Nuga Global's chairman, and friend of Ji-wan. He aspired to be a musician.
 Kyung Soo-jin as Kang Young-joo
25, Eun-soo's friend and has a crush on Ji-wan. She was a teacher before she started on scriptwriting.

Supporting characters 
Choi Myung-gil as Han Sun-hee
55, Eun-soo's adopted mother, Ji-wan's step-mother.
Jung Jae-soon as Lee Jin-yi
Early 70s, Eun-soo and Ji-wan's paternal grandmother.
Chun Ho-jin as Jang Tae-soo
55, Nuga Global's chairman, Hyun-do's father, friend of Ji-wan's late father.
Lee Hye-sook as Jung Soo-kyung
52, Hyun-do's mother, friend of Ji-wan's late father, Sun-hee's rival.
Song Ok-sook as Oh Min-ja
55, Yeong-joo's mother, Sun-hee's friend.
Jung Won-joong as Kang Jae-chul
53, Yeong-joo's father, banker.
Uhm Hyun-kyung as Seo Mi-jin
29, advertising manager at Nuga, Ji-wan and Hyun-do's superior, likes Ji-wan.
Nam Kyung-eup as Shin Yeong-hwan
50, President & CEO of Hwain Industry.
Bang Eun-hee as Park Haeng-sook
Ji-wan and Eun-soo's aunt.
Jung Jae-soon as Lee Jin-yi
Lee Jung-hyuk as Yoo-min 
Kim Ji-eun as Tae-soo's secretary
Yang Dae-hyuk as Waiter
Yoo Jae-myung as Department head Im.

Ratings 
Originally the drama aired with English subtitles on KBS World two weeks after its initial broadcast in Korea, this was later reduced to one week.

Key
-lowest rating episode
-highest rating episode

Awards and nominations

References

External links
  
 
 

Korean Broadcasting System television dramas
2015 South Korean television series debuts
2015 South Korean television series endings
Korean-language television shows
South Korean romance television series
South Korean comedy television series